South Carolina Highway 128 (SC 128), is a  state highway located entirely within Beaufort County, South Carolina. Also known locally as Savannah Highway, SC 128 serves as a principal arterial for the unincorporated Shell Point as well as providing a southern route serving Port Royal, Marine Corps Recruit Depot Parris Island, and the Sea Islands east of Beaufort.

Route description
SC 128 travels in a west-to-east direction and is a four-lane road for the entirety of its path. It alternates between traveling through the census-designated place of Shell Point and the town of Port Royal. SC 128 travels along the entirety of Savannah Highway. Beginning at an intersection with SC 170 just before the Broad River Bridge, SC 128 travels east towards its eastern terminus at U.S. Route 21 (US 21).

History

Until 2012, SC 128 was signed as SC 802. With the re-routing of US 21 around Beaufort on February 26, 2012, the route for SC 802 was truncated to its current location on Lady's Island, thus resulting in the designation of SC 128 for the remaining portion of the old SC 802 route.

Major Intersections

See also

References

External links

SC 128 at Virginia Highways' South Carolina Highways Annex
Former SC 128 ALT at Virginia Highways' South Carolina Highways Annex

128
Transportation in Beaufort County, South Carolina